Santa Cruz Mixtepec is a town and municipality in Oaxaca in south-western Mexico. The town covers an area of 66.34 km². It is part of the Zimatlán District in the west of the Valles Centrales Region

In 2005, the municipality had a population of 2,984.

The church is notable for a number of colonial-era santos or statues of the saints, many of them executed in fine polychrome that has been well preserved.

References

Municipalities of Oaxaca